Michela may refer to:

Michela Alioto-Pier (born 1968), member of the San Francisco Board of Supervisors
Michela Vittoria Brambilla (born 1967), Italian politician and businesswoman
Michela Cobisi (born 1982), Italian retired pair skater
Michela Fanini (1973–1994), female racing cyclist from Italy
Michela Figini (born 1966), Swiss former alpine skier
Michela Luci (born 2006), actor
Michela Maggioni (born 1988), Italian fashion model
Michela Pace (born 2001), Maltese singer who represented Malta in the Eurovision Song Contest 2019
Michela Ponza (born 1979), Italian professional biathlete
Michela Torrenti (born 1977), Italian judoka
Michela Wrong (born 1961), British journalist, author and foreign correspondent
1045 Michela, asteroid

See also
Michelle (given name)

Italian feminine given names